Acid Beaters is a split album featuring American pop punk band The Queers and Italian pop punk band the Manges. The album's title is a play on words of the Ramones album Acid Eaters.

Track listing
"Chewy Chewy"- The Queers
"Ft. Lauderdale" – The Queers
"Girl About Town" – The Queers
"Sunday Morning" – The Queers
"Wipeout" – The Queers
"With a Girl Like You" – The Queers
"Frontline" – Manges
"Surrender" – Manges
"Barrage of Hate" – Manges
"Saving Private Pierson" – Manges
"I Don't Wanna Live in Hell" – Manges
"Morphine" – Manges

References

2003 albums
Split albums
The Queers albums
The Manges albums